Michelle McKeehan (born November 9, 1989) is an American competition swimmer.  She is a three-time medalist at the Pan American Games.

McKeehan was born in Beech Grove, Indiana in 1989, the daughter of Stu McKeehan and Amy Chase.  She is a 2008 graduate of Center Grove High School in Greenwood, Indiana. She swam collegiately for the University of Georgia, where she majored in public relations and speech communications. At the 2007 Pan American Games in Rio de Janeiro, where she won gold medals in the 100-meter breaststroke and 4x100-meter medley relay. Four years later at the 2011 Pan American Games in Guadalajara, McKeehan won a bronze medal in the 200-meter breaststroke.

References

External links
 
 Michelle McKeehan – University of Georgia athlete bio

1989 births
Living people
American female swimmers
American female breaststroke swimmers
People from Beech Grove, Indiana
Swimmers at the 2007 Pan American Games
Swimmers at the 2011 Pan American Games
Georgia Bulldogs women's swimmers
People from Greenwood, Indiana
Pan American Games bronze medalists for the United States
Pan American Games gold medalists for the United States
Pan American Games medalists in swimming
Medalists at the 2007 Pan American Games
Medalists at the 2011 Pan American Games